This section of the list of former state routes in New York contains all routes numbered between 51 and 100.

References

 051